Ian Johnston (Walter Ian Harewood Johnston, 16 February 1930 – 19 March 2001) was one of the true pioneers of reproductive medicine in Australia. He was a primary contributor to the development of human IVF (In vitro fertilisation) in Melbourne, Australia. He was the Head of the Reproductive Biology Unit at the Royal Women's Hospital, Melbourne and was the founding President and Honorary Life Member of The Fertility Society of Australia. Ian was known as the 'founding father of IVF in Australia'

One of his greatest moments was the announcement of the first Australian IVF pregnancy and the third of such pregnancies in the world. The birth of the first
Australian IVF baby, Candice Reed on 23 June 1980 was a moment of great national pride. (Note: The world's fourth IVF baby was also born at the Royal Women's Hospital.)

On 26 January 2001, Ian was awarded with Member of the Order of Australia for service to medicine. He died of laryngeal cancer a few months later.

Quotes 
 "His footprints are all over the pioneering technologies of IVF" – Alan Trounson, RBM Online, 2001
 "It's [IVF] part of my life. I wouldn't be here without it" - Candice Reed, The Sydney Morning Herald, 1 December 2005.

Education 
 Scotch College, Melbourne
 University of Melbourne, graduating in medicine in 1954.
 Master of Gynaecology & Obstetrics, University of Melbourne, 1964.

Awards 
 Founding President and Honorary Life Member of The Fertility Society of Australia
 Member of the Order of Australia (2001). For service to medicine, particularly in the areas of infertility and reproductive biology, through the development of treatment techniques, pioneering the use of laparoscopy as a diagnostic tool, and the establishment of support and counselling services for patients and their families.
 Royal Australian and New Zealand Collegeof Obstetricians and Gynaecologists. 2001 Honour Board

Appearances 
Johnston appeared in the documentary Chasing God as a scientist.

Sources 
 Reproductive BioMedicine Online, Volume 2, Number 3, May 2001, pp. 215–215(1). Author: Alan Trounson. Publisher: Reproductive Healthcare Ltd. 
 The Fertility Society of Australia. 
 Discovery Newsletter, (a publication of the royal women's hospital division of research & education), June 2001. 

1930 births
2001 deaths
Australian obstetricians
Members of the Order of Australia
Medical doctors from Melbourne
Deaths from laryngeal cancer
People educated at Scotch College, Melbourne